Wooden synagogues are an original style of vernacular synagogue architecture that emerged in the former Polish–Lithuanian Commonwealth. The style developed between the mid-16th and mid-17th centuries, a period of peace and prosperity for the Polish-Lithuanian Jewish community. While many were destroyed during the First and Second World Wars, there are some that survive today in Lithuania.

History 

According to Maria and Kazimierz Piechotka, wooden synagogues in Poland–Lithuania developed during the Renaissance, sometime from the mid-16th to mid-17th century. This period was described as a time of peace and prosperity for the Jewish community of the vast Polish–Lithuanian Commonwealth, which at its peak occupied much of Central and Eastern Europe. The style was particularly common in the eastern territories of the Commonwealth which now constitute Lithuania, Belarus and Ukraine. Moreover, such synagogues were predominantly found in smaller townships, villages and shtetls rather than larger cities. 

Timber was abundant and inexpensive in the heavily forested Commonwealth, but a large part of the motivation for building in wood rather than stone or brick was the great difficulty of obtaining government permission to erect masonry synagogues. The wooden synagogues, which featured multi-layered high roofs, multi-beamed domes, galleries, wooden balconies and arches were built to high standards of craftsmanship.

The synagogues fell victim to obsolescence and neglect over the next centuries. During the Second World War, the Germans burned and destroyed nearly all of the wooden synagogues that were still standing. None remain in Poland today, however, some did survive in Lithuania.

Uniqueness as an artistic and architectural form 

The wooden synagogue was "an original architectural genre" that drew on several models, including Poland's wooden building traditions and central plan, masonry synagogues in which four massive masonry pillars that define the Bimah rise to support the roof vaulting. Central pillars support the vaulting of only a handful of wooden synagogues. Instead, in wooden synagogues the vaulting and domes are suspended by elaborate roof trusses. Common features shared by wooden synagogues include the independence of the pitched roof from the design of the interior domed ceiling. The outside of a wooden synagogue gave no hint of the domes and multiple, Baroque vaults that would be found within. The exteriors were decidedly plain, giving no hint of the riot of carving, painting, domes, balconies and vaulting inside. The architectural interest of the exterior lay in the large scale of the buildings, the multiple, horizontal lines of the tiered roofs, and the carved corbels that supported them. The elaborate domed and vaulted ceilings were known as raki'a (Hebrew for sky or firmament) and were often painted blue sprinkled with stars. The Bimah was always placed in the center of the room. Wooden synagogues featured a single, large hall. In contrast to contemporary churches, there was no apse. Moreover, while contemporary churches featured imposing vestibules, the entry porches of the wooden synagogues was a low annex, usually with a simple lean-to roof. In these synagogues, the emphasis was on constructing a single, large, high-domed worship space.

According to art historian Stephen S. Kayser, the wooden synagogues of Poland with their painted and carved interiors were "a truly original and organic manifestation of artistic expression—the only real Jewish folk art in history".

According to Louis Lozowick, writing in 1947, the wooden synagogues were unique because, unlike all previous synagogues, they were not built in the architectural style of their region and era, but in a newly evolved and uniquely Jewish style, making them "a truly original folk expression", whose "originality does not lie alone in the exterior architecture, it lies equally in the beautiful and intricate wood carving of the interior".

Moreover, while in many parts of the world Jews were proscribed from entering the building trades and even from practicing the decorative arts of painting and woodcarving, the wooden synagogues were actually built by Jewish craftsmen. Other research points to certain synagogues being made by Christian master builders. For example, the early history of the Gwoździec Synagogue is unknown and portions of the structure date back to 1650. The original structure was built in a regional style exhibiting both Jewish and Polish vernacular architecture. In the 18th century there was a dramatic reconfiguration of the prayer hall ceiling. It is believed to be the first cupola of its kind. The timber framers are unknown but presumed to be Christian master builders since until the 19th century Jews were excluded from the trade. The liturgical paintings were made by Jewish artists. Isaac, son of Rabbi Judah Leib ha Cohen and Israel, son of Rabbi Mordecai, have inscribed their names on the paintings in the western ceiling.

The interior vaulting of the Wolpa Synagogue is described by art historians Maria and Kazimierz Piechotka as having been "the most magnificent of all known wooden ceilings" in Europe. Of course, since Christians were free to build with brick and stone, few European buildings of the scale of the Wolpa synagogue were ever built in wood. The walls of the main hall were 7.2 meters high. The vaulting, under a three-tiered roof, rose to a height of fourteen meters in three tiers marked by fancy balustrades. Each tier was made up of several curving sections faced in wooden paneling to form a graceful, tiered and vaulted dome. The vaulted ceiling was supported by the four wooden corner columns that rose form the bimah, and by trusses in the roof.

Art historian Ori Z. Soltes points out that the wooden synagogues, unusual for that period in being large, identifiably Jewish buildings not hidden in courtyards or behind walls, were built not only during a Jewish "intellectual golden age" but in a time and place where "the local Jewish population was equal to or even greater than the Christian population".

Types of wooden synagogues 
Wooden synagogues can be divided into three types by the plan of the building, according to an article by G.K. Lukomski.

 The first has a square plan and a pyramidal roof in one, two and even three stages with decorated cornices.
 The second type, oblong in shape, has a roof decorated with arcading. 
 The third type, more simple, resembles Polish secular buildings used to store grain, hay, etc.

Wooden synagogues may also be divided into three groups according to the shape of the roof and the number of cornices which divide them into stages (of the Mansard type, called in Polish "podcienie"), i.e., roofs with one, two or three stages.

 The type with roofs of one stage with perceptibly curved and tilted eaves, are probably the oldest in date. This is a very simple construction resembling a secular building used for agricultural purposes rather than a religious temple - a barn or store-house for grain. Its construction is very logical, or rational; every beam, every pillar and every buttress is clearly visible.

Examples: synagogue at Lanckorona in Podolie; Polaniec; Pareczow; Orsza; Szkloff; Radoszyce; Pilica; Nowogradek; Przedborz; Zydaczew; Brzozdowice; Pieczenierzyn; Jablonow.

 The type with two roofs are often very large. It is interesting to note that the facades of the two towers can differ in design. A characteristic detail is the covering of the walls with narrow planks which act as an outer lining.
Examples: Gwozdziec; Grodno; Chodorow; Uzlany (Usljany); Kamyenyets; Nasielsk; Njaswisch; Mogilev.

 The type with three stages or more.
Examples: Nowe-Miasto; Pohrebyszcze; Jedwabne; Narowla; Wolpa; Zabłudów.

Interior decoration 

The interiors were decorated with wall and ceiling paintings that, in many cases, covered the walls and ceilings entirely, and with elaborately carved wooden Torah arks.

Thomas Hubka has traced the style of decorative painting in the wooden synagogues to the medieval Hebrew illuminated manuscripts of Ashkenazi Jewry.

The intricate wooden decoration of the barrel vaulted ceiling of the Przedbórz Synagogue was considered so beautiful that before the Second World War it drew tourists to the small village of Przedbórz.

Regional variations 

Architectural historian Rachel Wischnitzer has traced regional variations in wooden synagogue style. The interiors of the wooden synagogues of Lithuania were not as exuberantly painted as were synagogues of other regions. Instead, Lithuanian synagogues were notable for architectural details such as ceilings with the boards laid in decorative herringbone patterns. Several Lithuanian synagogues featured corner pavilions. The wooden synagogues of Galicia were notable for their elaborate wall paintings.

Influence on art and architecture 

Frank Stella's Polish village series draws on images of Wooden synagogues published by Maria and Kazimierz Piechotka in their 1957 book, Wooden synagogues.
The Sons of Israel Synagogue, by architects Davis, Brody and Wisniewski, in Lakewood, New Jersey evokes Polish wooden synagogues in modern materials in the shape of its roof. 
The Temple B'rith Kodesh in Rochester, New York, by architect Pietro Belluschi is roofed with a domed wooden drum intended to evoke the wooden synagogues of Poland. 
The modern building of Congregation Beth Shalom Rodfe Zedek in Chester, Connecticut was designed by artist Sol LeWitt who conceptualized the "airy" synagogue building with its shallow dome supported by "exuberant wooden roof beams" as a homage to the Wooden synagogues of eastern Europe.

In culture 
Wooden synagogues were quite abundant, and several famous authors and artists include them in their works.

Adam Mickiewicz gives detailed description of wooden synagogues in his epic poem Pan Tadeusz, Or, the Last Foray in Lithuania; a Story of Life Among Polish Gentlefolk in the Years 1811 and 1812, first published in 1834.

Napoleon Orda, renowned Polish-Lithuanian artist, painted at least two wooden synagogues.

El Lissitzky wrote about the murals in Cold synagogue in Mogilev after his and Issachar Ber Ryback's expedition:

"Jewish period" was very short in the art of El Lissitzky; on the contrary, for Issachar Ber Ryback everyday life of a Jewish shtetl became the foundation of his art. Ryback created several paintings of wooden synagogues, he probably was inspired for these works during the shtetl tour few years earlier.

Marc Chagall claimed that Chaim Segal, the artist who created murals in the Cold synagogue in Mogilev and several other synagogues, was his greatgrandfather, and compares his own art to Segal's synagogue murals:

List of wooden synagogues

Survived wooden synagogues 

Although it was long thought that none of the wooden synagogues survived the destruction of the First and Second World Wars, it is now known that a number do survive, albeit only of the smaller type.

Surviving examples include:
 Synagogue of Alanta, built in the late 19th century, in deteriorating condition
 Kaltinėnai (in Commonwealth gmina Szyłele)
 Kurkliai, in Soviet times used as barn, now in deteriorating condition
 Laukuva
 Pakruojis, the largest of the wooden synagogues that survives in present-day Lithuania (built 1801), restored in 2017.
 Rozalimas, built in 19th century
 Subate (Latvia)
 Telšiai, built in the 19th century, vacated around 1940
 Tirkšliai
 Trakai, a Karaite synagogue called Kenesa built in the 18th century, with Torah ark and interior preserved in good condition
 Veisiejai
 Žiežmariai, under restoration since March 2016, exterior works completed in 2018

Destroyed in the 21st century:
 Plungė, brought down in 2007
 Seda, built in the early 20th century, collapsed in 2005

Destroyed wooden synagogues 

Almost all wooden synagogues were destroyed in the 20th century. Some of them were documented during the ethnographic expeditions.
 Cold Synagogue, Mogilev - with murals from 1740, documented by El Lissitzky and Issachar Ber Ryback
 Gwoździec Synagogue - with murals from 1652, reconstructed in POLIN Museum of the History of Polish Jews
 Wołpa Synagogue - reputed to be the "most beautiful" of the wooden synagogues
 Przedbórz Synagogue
 Nasielsk Synagogue

Replicas 

There is a replica of the Wołpa Synagogue in Bilgoraj, and another replica of the synagogue (Połaniec) is in Sanok.

POLIN Museum of the History of Polish Jews in Warsaw has a partial reconstruction of the Gwoździec Synagogue. The ceiling painting of the synagogue in Chodoriw was reconstructed for the ANU - Museum of the Jewish People (Beit Hatefusot) in Tel Aviv.

In the Musée d'Art et d'Histoire du Judaïsme (Museum of Jewish Art and History) in Paris there are models of several wooden synagogues.

See also 
 List of wooden synagogues
 History of the Jews in Poland
 History of the Jews in Lithuania
 History of the Jews in Galicia (Eastern Europe)
 History of the Jews in Ukraine
 Three hares
 Vernacular architecture of the Carpathians

References

Further reading 
 Thomas C. Hubka, Resplendent Synagogue: Architecture and Worship in an Eighteenth Century Polish Community Brandeis University Press, 2003
 Maria and Kazimierz Piechotka, Heaven's Gate: Wooden Synagogues in the Territory of the Former Polish-Lithuanian Commonwealth, Institute of Art, Polish Academy of Sciences, Wydawnnictwo Krupski I S-ka, Warsaw, 2004 , 
 Maria Piechotka, Kazimierz Piechotka, Wooden Synagogues, Politechnika Warszawska Zakład Architektury Polskiej, Published by Arkady, 1957 in Polish, 1959 in English ,

External links 

 About Wooden Synagogues, by Maria and Kazimierz Piechotka
 Heaven’s Gates: Wooden Synagogues in the Territories of the Former Polish-Lithuanian Commonwealth – Maria & Kazimierz Piechotka
 Synagogue Architecture at YIVO encyclopedia
 Gallery from Maria and Kazimierz Piechotka's books
 Research on wooden synagogues and Stella’s Polish inspirations
 A Brief History of Polish Wooden Synagogues
 REPLICATING THE GWOZDZIEC WOODEN SYNAGOGUE
 About the murals in wooden synagogues at lostmural.org
 The Lost Wooden Synagogues of Eastern Europe
 Moshe Verbin: Wooden Synagogues of Poland in the 17th and 18th Century
 Common Heritage: The Wooden Synagogues of Poland
 The Wooden Synagogues of Lithuania

Polish-Lithuanian
Polish–Lithuanian Commonwealth
Synagogues
Synagogues
Synagogues
.
.
.
Architectural styles
Ashkenazi Jews topics
Wooden buildings and structures in Lithuania
Wooden buildings and structures in Poland
Wooden buildings and structures in Ukraine